Thomas Rouxel (born 26 May 1991) is a French badminton player affiliated with Chambly Oise club. In 2016, he won the silver medal at the European Men's Team Championships in Kazan, Russia.

Career 
Rouxel helped the team to win silver in the European Men's Team Championships. He also help the team to achieve bronze two years later in the men's team event. Thomas reached the finals of the 2019 Orléans Masters Super 100. He lost in the final to Koki Watanabe in 3 games. 

Rouxel announced his retirement from badminton on 2 September 2022 on his Instagram account.

Achievements

BWF World Tour (1 runners-up) 
The BWF World Tour, which was announced on 19 March 2017 and implemented in 2018, is a series of elite badminton tournaments sanctioned by the Badminton World Federation (BWF). The BWF World Tour is divided into levels of World Tour Finals, Super 1000, Super 750, Super 500, Super 300 (part of the HSBC World Tour), and the BWF Tour Super 100.

Men's singles

BWF International Challenge/Series 
Men's singles

  BWF International Challenge tournament
  BWF International Series tournament
  BWF Future Series tournament

References

External links 
 

1991 births
Living people
Sportspeople from Rennes
French male badminton players
21st-century French people